The Tyranny of Distance may refer to:
 The Tyranny of Distance: How Distance Shaped Australia's History, book by Geoffrey Blainey
 The Tyranny of Distance (album), by Ted Leo and the Pharmacists.
"The tyranny of distance" is a notable line in Split Enz's song "Six Months in a Leaky Boat"